The Sun Kiss 47 is a French sailboat that was designed by Philippe Briand as a cruiser and first built in 1982.

The design is the larger of the two boats that make up the Sun Kiss sailboat range, the other being the Sun Kiss 45. The Sun Kiss 47 is a lengthened version of the Sun Kiss 45.

Production
The design was built by Jeanneau in France, from 1982 until 1989, with 315 boats completed.

Design
The Sun Kiss 47 is a recreational keelboat, built predominantly of fiberglass, with wood trim. It has a cutter rig, with a deck-stepped mast, two sets of unswept spreaders and aluminum spars with stainless steel wire rigging. The hull has a raked stem, a walk-through reverse transom, an internally mounted spade-type rudder controlled by a wheel and a fixed fin keel, shoal draft keel or optional stub keel and retractable centerboard. The fixed keel model displaces  and carries  of ballast, while the centerboard version displaces  and carries  of ballast.

The design has sleeping accommodation for up to eight people, with a double berth in the forward cabin or an option of two bow cabins. There is an "L"-shaped settee and a straight settee in the main cabin and two aft cabins, both  with double berths. The galley is located on the starboard side amidships and is equipped with a two-burner stove, ice box and a double sink. A navigation station is aft of the galley, on the starboard side. There are two heads, one just forward of the bow cabin in the forepeak and one centered aft, along with separate sinks in each aft cabin.

See also
List of sailing boat types

References

External links

Keelboats
1980s sailboat type designs
Sailing yachts
Sailboat type designs by Philippe Briand
Sailboat types built by Jeanneau